Karim Eslami is an Iranian football striker who plays for Nassaji in the Persian Gulf League.

Club career

Esteghlal Khuzestan
Eslami joined Saba Qom in summer 2011. After second season with Qomi side, he moved to Mes Kerman. In summer 2015 he moved back to Saba Qom.

Club career statistics

References

External links
 Karim Eslami at PersianLeague.com
 Karim Eslami at IranLeague.ir

1986 births
Living people
Iranian footballers
Nassaji Mazandaran players
Sanat Mes Kerman F.C. players
Saba players
Association football forwards
People from Nowshahr
Sportspeople from Mazandaran province